The following outline is provided as an overview of and topical guide to Guernsey:

The Bailiwick of Guernsey – British Crown dependency located in the Channel Islands off the coast of Normandy.

As well as the Isle of Guernsey, the bailiwick also comprises Alderney, Sark, Herm, Jethou, Brecqhou, Burhou, Lihou and other islets.  Although the defence of all these islands is the responsibility of the United Kingdom, Guernsey is not part of the UK but rather a separate possession of the Crown, comparable to the Isle of Man. Guernsey is also not part of the European Union. The island of Guernsey is divided into ten parishes. Together with the Bailiwick of Jersey, it is included in the collective grouping known as the Channel Islands. Guernsey belongs to the Common Travel Area.

General reference

 Pronunciation: 
 Common English country name: Guernsey
 Official English country name:  The Bailiwick of Guernsey
 Common endonym(s):  
 Official endonym(s):  
 Adjectival(s):
 Demonym(s):
 Etymology: Name of Guernsey
 ISO country codes:  GG, GGY, 831
 ISO region codes:  See ISO 3166-2:GG
 Internet country code top-level domain:  .gg

Geography of Guernsey 

Geography of Guernsey
 Guernsey is: A British Crown dependency
 Location:
 Northern Hemisphere and Western Hemisphere
 Europe
 Northern Europe
 Atlantic Ocean
 English Channel
 Time zone:  Western European Time or Greenwich Mean Time (UTC+00), Western European Summer Time or British Summer Time (UTC+01)
 Extreme points of Guernsey
 High:  Le Moulin on Sark 
 Low: English Channel 0 m
 Land boundaries:  none
 Coastline:  50 km
 Population of Guernsey: 65,150 (March 2014)  - 189th most populous country

 Area of Guernsey: 78 km2
 Atlas of Guernsey

Environment of Guernsey 

 Climate of Guernsey
 Geology of Guernsey
 Protected areas of Guernsey

Natural geographic features of Guernsey 
 World Heritage Sites in Guernsey: None

Regions of Guernsey

Administrative divisions of Guernsey 
 Parishes of Guernsey

Municipalities of Guernsey 

 Capital of Guernsey: St Peter Port

Demography of Guernsey 

Demographics of Guernsey

Government and politics of Guernsey 

Politics of Guernsey
 Form of government: parliamentary representative democratic British Crown dependency
 Capital of Guernsey: St Peter Port
 Elections in Guernsey
 Political parties in Guernsey

Branches of the government of Guernsey 

Government of Guernsey

Executive branch of the government of Guernsey 
 Head of state: Bailiff of Guernsey,
 Head of government: Chief Minister,
 Cabinet of Guernsey: Policy Council of Guernsey

Legislative branch of the government of Guernsey 

 Parliament of Guernsey (bicameral)

Judicial branch of the government of Guernsey 

Courts of Guernsey
 Royal Court

Foreign relations of Guernsey 

Foreign relations of Guernsey
 Diplomatic missions in Guernsey

International organization membership 
The Bailiwick of Guernsey is a member of:
British-Irish Council (BIC)
Universal Postal Union (UPU)

Law and order in Guernsey 

Law of Guernsey
 Constitution of Guernsey
 Crime in Guernsey
 Human rights in Guernsey
 LGBT rights in Guernsey
 Freedom of religion in Guernsey
 Law enforcement in Guernsey

Military of Guernsey 

Military of Guernsey
 Command
 Commander-in-chief:
 Lieutenant Governor
 Military history of Guernsey
 Channel Islands Occupation Society
 Royal Guernsey Militia
 Royal Guernsey Light Infantry
 Fortifications of Guernsey

Local government in Guernsey 

States of Guernsey

History of Guernsey 

History of Guernsey
Timeline of the history of Guernsey
Current events of Guernsey
 German occupation of the Channel Islands
 German fortification of Guernsey
 Maritime history of the Channel Islands

Culture of Guernsey 

Culture of Guernsey
 Architecture of Guernsey
 Cuisine of Guernsey
 Guernsey Bean Jar
 Guernsey Gâche
 Festivals in Guernsey
 Viaer Marchi
 Guernsey Festival of Performing Arts
 Languages of Guernsey
 Media in Guernsey
 Guernsey Press and Star
 BBC Radio Guernsey
 Island FM
 ITV Channel Television
 National symbols of Guernsey
 Coat of arms of Guernsey
 Flag of Guernsey
 National anthem of Guernsey
 People of Guernsey
 Public holidays in Guernsey
 Records of Guernsey
 Religion in Guernsey
 List of churches, chapels and meeting halls in the Channel Islands
 Islam in Guernsey
 World Heritage Sites in Guernsey: None

Art in Guernsey 
 Art in Guernsey
 Cinema of Guernsey
 Literature of Guernsey
 Victor Hugo
 Toilers of the Sea
 Les Misérables
 Hauteville House
 Ebenezer Le Page
 The Book of Ebenezer Le Page
 Music of Guernsey
 Television in Guernsey
 Theatre in Guernsey

Sports in Guernsey 

Sports in Guernsey
 Football in Guernsey
 Guernsey F.C.
 Jackson League
 Priaulx League
 Guernsey Rovers A.C.
 Vale Recreation F.C.
 Sark football team
 Muratti Vase
 Cricket in Guernsey
 Guernsey cricket team
 Inter-insular match
 Guernsey at the Olympics
 Guernsey at the Island Games
 Motor Racing in Guernsey
 Val des Terres Hill Climb
 Rugby in Guernsey
 Guernsey RFC
 Siam Cup
 Sport Facilities in Guernsey
 Footes Lane
 The Track
 The Corbet Field

Economy and infrastructure of Guernsey 

Economy of Guernsey
 Economic rank, by nominal GDP (2007): 151st (one hundred and fifty first)
 Agriculture in Guernsey
 Golden Guernsey
 Guernsey cattle
 Banking in Guernsey
 National Bank of Guernsey
 Communications in Guernsey
 Internet in Guernsey
 Companies of Guernsey
Currency of Guernsey: Pound
ISO 4217: n/a (informally GGP)
 Energy in Guernsey
 Energy policy of Guernsey
 Channel Islands Electricity Grid
 Oil industry in Guernsey
 Health care in Guernsey
 Mining in Guernsey
 Regulators in Guernsey
 Guernsey Financial Services Commission
 Stock Exchange
 Tourism in Guernsey
 Transport in Guernsey
 Airports in Guernsey
 Rail transport in Guernsey
 Roads in Guernsey

Education in Guernsey 

Education in Guernsey
List of schools in Guernsey

See also 

Guernsey
Index of Guernsey-related articles
List of Guernsey-related topics
Bibliography of Guernsey
List of international rankings
Outline of Europe
Outline of geography
Outline of the United Kingdom

References

External links

States of Guernsey - official government site
VisitGuernsey/ Guernsey Tourism
BBC Guernsey - local features and news
This Is Guernsey - information and news from the Guernsey Press and Star
The Guille-Allès Library - public library
The Priaulx Library - local studies library
La Société Guernesiaise
The Guernsey Society - a network for Guernsey people worldwide
Donkipedia - a wiki dedicated to the Bailiwick of Guernsey, its people, places and history
Map of Guernsey

Guernsey